Octyl gallate is the ester of 1-octanol and gallic acid.  As a food additive, it is used under the E number E311 as an antioxidant and preservative.

Properties
Octyl gallate is a white powder with a characteristic odor. It is very slightly soluble in water and soluble in alcohol. Its solubility in lard is 1.1%. Octyl gallate darkens in the presence of iron.

Uses
This antioxidant is used in numerous pharmaceutical, cosmetic, and food products; such as soaps, shampoos, shaving soaps, skin lotions, deodorants, margarine, and peanut butter. 

It is a synergistic antioxidant with butylated hydroxytoluene (BHT) and butylated hydroxyanisole (BHA).

References

Carboxylate esters
Food antioxidants
Pyrogallols
E-number additives